The New York State Pavilion is a historic world's fair pavilion at Flushing Meadows–Corona Park in Flushing, Queens, New York. It was designed in 1962 for the 1964 New York World's Fair by architects Philip Johnson and Richard Foster, with structural engineer Lev Zetlin.

Architecture

The pavilion consists of three components of reinforced concrete and steel construction: the "Tent of Tomorrow", Observation Towers, and "Theaterama".

The Tent of Tomorrow is elliptical in plan, and its sixteen 100-foot reinforced concrete piers once supported the largest cable suspension roof in the world. The main floor of the Tent was a large scale design of a Texaco highway map of New York State, made of terrazzo. An idea floated after the fair to use the floor for the World Trade Center did not materialize.

The towers have observation platforms which were once accessed by two (now-removed) "Sky Streak capsule" elevators attached to the tallest (western) tower.

Theaterama was originally a single drum-shaped volume of reinforced concrete. Additions to the original structure were made from 1992 to 1993 and from 2008 to 2009. The Theaterama is home to the Queens Theatre, a performing arts center which produces and presents theatre and dance, as well as children's and cultural programming.

After the fair
The New York State Pavilion was one of two pavilions retained for future use; the other one was the United States Pavilion building. No reuse was ever found for the US Pavilion however, and it became severely deteriorated and vandalized; it was ultimately demolished in 1977.

The New York State Pavilion was used for TV and movie sets, such as an episode of McCloud; for The Wiz; part of the setting (and the plot) for Men in Black; and the centerpiece for the Stark Expo in Iron Man 2. 
It was also the venue for rock concerts, as part of the Singer Bowl Festival in 1969, which included Led Zeppelin, the Grateful Dead, James Brown, Joe Cocker, Santana and other headline groups of the era (see  for poster ads). It was also the filming location in 1987 for the video clip for the debut single by They Might Be Giants, Don't Let's Start.

In the decades after the fair closed, it was an abandoned and badly neglected relic, with its roof gone and the once bright floors and walls almost faded away. Once the red ceiling tiles were removed from the pavilion in the late 1970s, for safety reasons, the terrazzo floor was subject to the elements and was ruined.  In 1994, the Queens Theatre took over the Circarama adjacent to the towers, and continues to operate there, using the ruined state pavilion as a storage depot.

For the 50th anniversary of the World's Fair, on the morning of April 22, 2014, the long-shuttered New York State Pavilion was opened to the public for three hours. Because of the pavilion's state of decay, visitors were required to wear hardhats. The event was hosted by the New York State Pavilion Paint Project and NYC Parks. A larger than expected crowd turned out, upwards of five thousand people, to get the rare glimpse inside the Tent of Tomorrow. That same day, the National Trust for Historic Preservation also named the Pavilion as one of its National Treasures.

Restoration plans

Some conservation and restoration efforts were demonstrated in 2008 by researchers from the University of Pennsylvania, and a handful of local groups are advocating to raise funds to complete the restoration of the terrazzo floor. The pavilion was listed on the National Register of Historic Places in 2009.

In late 2013, the New York City Department of Parks and Recreation announced plans to restore the pavilion with new landscaped paths and event spaces at an estimated cost of $73 million, as opposed to the $14 million cost to demolish the structure. Renewed interest was shown in the pavilion's restoration in early 2014, the 50th anniversary of its opening. In July 2014, the pavilion received about $5.8 million for restoration. The New York Mets also donated some money for the preservation effort. However, the pavilion was damaged the same month by arsonists.

In May 2015, the New York Structural Steel Painting Contractors Association, in conjunction with the New York City Parks Department and members of the International Union of Painters and Allied Trades (District Council 9, Local 806), announced a project to repaint the rusty steel framework of the Tent of Tomorrow. After testing paint chips, the color "American Cheese Yellow" was selected as the best match for the original color. The majority of the labor was done by union trainees, and materials were supplied by the contractors, constituting a $3 million donation. All work was completed by August 2015.

In March 2016, People For the Pavilion and the National Trust for Historic Preservation launched an international ideas competition for the pavilion.  Two proposed designs for the New York State Pavilion's restoration won New York City's 2018 Annual Awards for Excellence in Design. , the New York City government planned to award contracts for the pavilion's restoration, set to be worth $14.25 million, in May 2019. The restoration was planned to take up to one and a half years. Work on the project started in November 2019, and the restoration was expected to be completed in early 2021.

In media

The Pavilion is the subject of a documentary film titled Modern Ruin: A World's Fair Pavilion produced by filmmaker and teacher Matthew Silva.  The documentary premiered on May 22, 2015, in the Queens Theatre which was formerly the theaterama, the third component of the New York State Pavilion.

See also
List of towers
Space Needle

References

External links

New York World's Fair 1964 1965 - New York State Pavilion 
New York State Pavilion Project
People for the Pavilion

Buildings and structures completed in 1964
Buildings and structures in Queens, New York
Buildings and structures on the National Register of Historic Places in New York City
Flushing Meadows–Corona Park
Historic American Engineering Record in New York City
National Register of Historic Places in Queens, New York
World's fair architecture in New York City
New York (state) maps
1964 New York World's Fair